Central Branch may refer to:
Central Branch (Long Island Rail Road)
Central Branch Union Pacific Railroad